Is My Face Red? is a 1932 American pre-Code drama film directed by William A. Seiter and written by Ben Markson and Casey Robinson. The film stars Helen Twelvetrees, Ricardo Cortez, Jill Esmond, Robert Armstrong and Arline Judge. It was released on June 17, 1932 by RKO Pictures.

Plot

Cast
 Helen Twelvetrees as Peggy Bannon
 Ricardo Cortez as William Poster
 Jill Esmond as Mildred Huntington
 Robert Armstrong as Ed Maloney
 Arline Judge as Bee, Poster's Secretary
 Zasu Pitts as Morning Gazette Telephone Operator
 Clarence Muse as Horatio
 Sidney Toler as Tony Mugatti
 Fletcher Norton as Angelo Spinello

References

External links
 
 
 
 

1932 films
American black-and-white films
1930s English-language films
RKO Pictures films
Films directed by William A. Seiter
Films scored by Max Steiner
1932 drama films
American drama films
1930s American films